Robert Edwin Harrison (26 April 1906 in Mellor, England – 1964) was a former international speedway rider who featured in the first Speedway World Championship in final in 1936.

Career summary
Harrison started his career with the Belle Vue Aces in 1929 and stayed with them until the outbreak of World War II in 1939. In 1930 he made his England debut in the first ever Test series against Australia. Harrsion was in the Aces team that won the National League championship four times in succession from 1933 to 1936. They also won the National Trophy four times between 1933 and 1937.

After the war Harrison was allocated to the West Ham Hammers by the Speedway Control Board. He scored well for the Hammers but a serious injury in 1947 affected him badly. A poor season in 1948 left Harrison contemplating retirement. After one meeting for West Ham in the 1949 season he transferred back to the Belle Vue Aces where he helped them win the National Trophy. Harrison retired from racing at the end of the season.

World Final Appearances
 1936 -  London, Wembley Stadium - 12th - 5pts + 10 semi-final points
 1937 -  London, Wembley Stadium - 17th - 7 semi-final points

Players cigarette cards
Harrison is listed as number 19 of 50 in the 1930s Player's cigarette card collection.

References 

1906 births
1964 deaths
British speedway riders
English motorcycle racers
Belle Vue Aces riders
West Ham Hammers riders
People from Mellor, Greater Manchester
Sportspeople from Derbyshire